The 2019–20 Momentum One Day Cup was a domestic one-day cricket tournament that took place in South Africa. It was the 39th edition of the championship, with the tournament originally scheduled to run from 31 January to 21 March 2020. Titans were the defending champions.

Following the conclusion of the group stage, Dolphins, Lions, Warriors and Knights had qualified for the semi-finals. However, on 16 March 2020, Cricket South Africa suspended all cricket in the country for 60 days due to the COVID-19 pandemic. On 24 March 2020, Dolphins were named as the winners of the tournament, following the recommendations of Graeme Smith, the acting Director of Cricket.

Points table

 Teams qualified for the finals

Fixtures

Round-robin

Finals

References

External links
 Series home at ESPN Cricinfo

South African domestic cricket competitions
Momentum One Day Cup
2019–20 South African cricket season
Momentum One Day Cup